West Nile may refer to:

West Nile fever, a disease caused by the West Nile virus
West Nile sub-region, Uganda
West Nile virus, a virus that causes West Nile fever